Brond is a 1987 British three-part drama television series made by Channel 4, based on the novel of the same name by Scottish author Frederic Lindsay. It was directed by Michael Caton-Jones and starred Stratford Johns, John Hannah in his first television role, Louise Beattie and James Cosmo.

Plot
Brond is a thriller set in Glasgow, Scotland. Stratford Johns plays the titular Brond, an amoral leader of the Scottish Liberation Army. Robert, a student at Glasgow University, played by John Hannah in his first screen role, witnesses Brond murdering a small boy on a bridge. Robert later meets Brond at a party, and gradually gets drawn in to a sequence of violent events.

Cast
Stratford Johns as Brond
John Hannah as Robert
Louise Beattie as Margaret
James Cosmo as Primo
Bernadette Shortt as Jackie Kennedy
Sandy Neilson as Baxter
Raymond Ross as Professor Gracemount
Billy McElhaney as Muldoon
Ian McElhinney as Kennedy

Production
Brond is adapted by its author from the novel of the same name. In 2005 Brond the novel was picked as one of the 100 Best Scottish Books of All Time.

Channel 4 commissioned musician Bill Nelson to compose the theme tune and music for the series. The music, co-written with Daryl Runswick, was released under the band name 'Scala'.

Home media
On 30 July 2018, Simply Media released Brond - The Complete Series on DVD.

References

External links

Scottish television series
1980s British drama television series
1987 British television series debuts
1987 British television series endings
1980s British television miniseries
British thriller television series
Channel 4 television dramas
English-language television shows
Television series set in the 1980s
Television shows directed by Michael Caton-Jones
Television shows set in Glasgow